BUL Storm is a semi-automatic pistol made by Israeli firearms manufacturer BUL Transmark  based on the Czech-designed CZ 75.

The Storm is Bul's first all-steel pistol. It comes in two versions: a carry / duty version with fixed sights, and a competition version with cocking serrations on its slide, a fiber optic front sight and adjustable notch rear sight. The latter is optimized for the rules of the Production Division of IPSC practical shooting.

References

Semi-automatic pistols of Israel
9mm Parabellum semi-automatic pistols